Spirit of Nuff...Nuff is an album by Henry Threadgill released on the Black Saint label in 1991 produced by Flavio and Giovanni Bonandrini.  The album and features seven of Threadgill's compositions performed by Threadgill's Very Very Circus with Curtis Fowlkes, Brandon Ross, Masujaa, Marcus Rojas, Edwin Rodriguez, and Gene Lake.

Reception
The Allmusic review by Stephen Cook awarded the album 4½ stars, stating, "Henry Threadgill changes direction once again with a two tuba, two guitar, trombone, and drums outfit he calls Very Very Circus. Threadgill's layered, idiosyncratic compositions still abound, but as one would expect from a front line like this, the sound is darker and more dense than on prior releases... Another excellent title from one of jazz's most progressive and original artists".

Track listing
All compositions by Henry Threadgill
 "Hope a Hope A" - 7:40 
 "Unrealistic Love" - 10:39
 "Drivin' You Slow and Crazy" - 10:29 
 "Bee Dee Aff" - 9:28 
 "First Church of This" - 8:04 
 "Exacto" - 5:02 
 "In the Ring" - 6:48 
Recorded at R.P.M. Studios, New York City on November 19, 20, and 21, 1990

Personnel
Henry Threadgill - alto saxophone, flute
Curtis Fowlkes - trombone
Brandon Ross, Masujaa - electric guitar
Marcus Rojas, Edwin Rodriguez - tuba
Gene Lake - drums

References

1991 albums
Henry Threadgill albums
Black Saint/Soul Note albums